Bismuth fluoride may refer to:

 Bismuth trifluoride, BiF3
 Bismuth pentafluoride, BiF5